Vaada Raha is a Hindi film, released on 11 September 2009. It stars Bobby Deol in the lead role and Kangana Ranaut and Atul Agnihotri in special appearances. It is directed by Samir Karnik. Some part of the film was shot in Ephesus, Turkey.

Plot
After receiving a generous grant from the American Medical Association, Dr. Dyanesh Kripal "Duke" Chawla (Bobby Deol) who always gives hope to his patients, proposes to his sweetheart, Pooja (Kangana Ranaut), and they arrange to get married soon. While returning home that night, he meets with an accident and wakes up in the East West Hospital place of recovery. Shattered and devastated, he is in for more trauma and shock when he finds out that Pooja will have nothing to do with him anymore. Upset, bitter and in despair, he loses his will to live, refuses to take medicine nor any treatment and awaits death. One day, Roshan (Dwij Yadav) a young boy enters Duke's life to rekindle the hope again. He starts telling him stories of the world seen outside his window and motivates him to take his medicines and start his physiotherapy. Day by day Duke starts improving and one fine day he realises that Roshan was suffering from terminal cancer and he died leaving a new life for Duke.

Cast
Bobby Deol as Dr. Dyanesh Kripal Chawla aka Duke
Kangana Ranaut as Pooja
Mohnish Behl as Dr. Max
Atul Agnihotri
 Prince Parth
Prateeksha Lonkar as Dr. Kelkar
Sharat Saxena as Mr. Sinha
Vivek Shauq as Olderly
Farida Dadi as Pooja's mom
Dwij Yadav as Roshan Suraj Sharma
Rajesh Vivek as Mr. Bakshi
 Sanjeev Mehra as Balwinder Singh Chaddha
 Rushita Singh as Sneha
 Shahab Khan as Mr. Shah 
Pariva Pranati
 Ravi Shankar Jaiswal as Patient

Music
The music directors of the film are Monty Sharma and Babbu Mann.

Track listing
"Vaada Raha" - Toshi Sabri
"Rabb Na Kare" - Babbu Mann (Music and Lyrics Also By Babbu Maan)
"Kubul" - Parthiv Gothil, Sharmista Chatreeji (Lyrics By Babbu Maan) 
"Aaj Aasmaan" - Shaan (Lyrics By Babbu Maan)
"Rabb Na Kare" (Slow) - Babbu Mann
"Achal Hain Mere Hausle" - Kunal Ganjawala
"Vaada Raha" (Remix) - Toshi Sabri (Remixed by DJ Sanj)
"Vaada Raha" - Theme
"Flying High" - Theme
"Lost in Love" - Theme

References

External links

Films about disability in India
2000s Hindi-language films
2009 films
Films directed by Samir Karnik